Johann Friedrich Dietler (1804–1874) was a Swiss portrait painter.

He was born in Solothurn, Switzerland, on February 4, 1804. His father was also an artist and he started painting in the family workshop. His first professional art instruction came from Karl Germann (c.1790–93-?), a local drawing master.

From 1822 to 1833 he was in Paris to continue his training under Antoine-Jean Gros, and copied the Old Masters in the Louvre. He later worked under Léopold Robert in Venice, Italy from 1834 to 1835.  After spending some time in Geneva, he finally settled in Berne, where he worked primarily as a portrait painter and was very popular among the patricians there, as well as in Solothurn, Freiburg and Basel. He often painted from small photographs of his subjects, but was very concerned that photography would put portrait painters out of work.

He died in Berne on May 4, 1874.

References

Attribution:

External links 

 

1804 births
1874 deaths
People from Solothurn
19th-century Swiss painters
Swiss male painters
Swiss portrait painters
19th-century Swiss male artists